Puppet film develops on the basis of traditional puppetry. It is in the form of a film that the main characters are puppets. Puppets’ limbs are controlled by people and their mouths usually does not move frequently. The height of a puppet is approximately 20 centimeters and the background is a model which fits the size of the puppet. The film is shot by grid-by-frame photography. Puppet film starts around 1900s. Between 1930s and 1980s, most genres of puppet films are comedy and animation. There are some famous magnum opus such as Thunderbirds series and The Adventures of Elmo in Grouchland. After 1980s, many horror puppet films appeared such as Puppet Master: The Littlest Reich. Compared to other films, puppet film focuses more on characters’ movements and the main audiences are children and teenagers. More and more reality elements are added into puppet film in recent years.

History 

The first puppet film " Dolly's Toys " is shown in 1902. It is also the first puppet animation in history. It is inspired by puppetry and uses puppets as main characters in the films.

In Europe,   Great Britain creates the earliest series of puppet films in 1900s. After 1920s, many great puppet films appears among different European countries, such as Germany's "Eva and Grasshopper"(1928), Poland's "For Pete's Sake"(1966) and France's "Frags Who Wanted a King"(1923).  The main genre is comedy.

In the USA, puppet film starts from 1910s. Similar to Europe, puppets in the films are controlled by strings which are usually hidden under the ground. Puppet film is popular in Hollywood from the beginning. Many special effects are added into the films. In 1979, director James Frawley create the first live-action film in the USA and the film is the start of the famous "Muppet Series".

In Asia, puppetry is more popular than puppet films. In the middle of 20th centuries, some Asian countries starts putting puppets into their animation films. In 1953, China creates its first puppet animation film Emperor's Dream. It is one of the earliest puppet films in Asia according to the current research.

Film production process

The construction of puppets 

Similar to Puppetry, all kinds of the puppets in the early 20th centuries are controlled by hands working. However, Not every puppet can be used in a film. While puppets in the puppetry perform in front of the stage, puppets in puppet films are recorded frame-by- frame by a camera. The puppets' height are usually around 30 centimetres. Their heads are made of wood, plastics or moulded rubber. To turn a puppet into a live character in the film, facial expression is crucial. Puppets‘ facial features are usually moveable so that they can behave like talking or sleeping  A few puppets use plain face with repainted features to show the changes of characters' feelings. Moreover, Some studios will prepare different heads for puppets and changes them during the production process. Puppets also have three types of bodies. They are distinguished by the materials which have been mentioned above. After the invention of CGI, some puppets uses CGI and create more fantastic effect. The alien in the film E.T is a good example.

Settings and techniques 
The scale of the scene is followed by the size of the puppets. To make such a scene, many small items are used in the beginning of puppet film, such as stones, sticks and boxes.  A close-up shot is always used to make audiences focus more on characters' movements instead of the rough background. In the meantime, effects like earthquake are required in the puppet film.  The setting needs more solid material. But considering the reflection of light on the object will cause unnecessary shine, the studios usually use flat enamel and lacquer.

As the scene of puppet film is smaller than the real world, errors are easily expanded. So when setting the lighting, special equipment will be used. Halogen lamps are common devices in puppet films. The Halogen lighting unit is "small, lightweight and high mobile". Also, spotlights are set in the smallest position so that the extra light will be avoided.

Compare to cartoon or animation, it is much more difficult to add dialogues into puppet films. The timing must be critical as the sound is recorded before the movements.  It is hard to catch the  puppets' mouth movements in every sentence. So the studios prefer to eliminate the conversation in. the early puppet films and add more music and sound effects. The audiences need to derive the meaning by themselves. But with the development of technology, more and more dialogues are added after 1950s.

Representative works 

From 1900s to the early 1970s, most of the puppet films are animation or comedy. After 1970s, the Puppet Master Series changes the mainstream into horror style. Many horror puppet films are created between 1980s and 2000s. The list below includes different types of excellent puppet films at each time.

Early 20th Century 
 Dreams of Toyland (1908)
 The Great Gabbo (1929)

1940s 
 Spalicek (1947)
 The Emperor's Nightingale (1949)

1950s 
 LiLi (1953)
 The Emperor's Dream

1960s 
 Thunderbirds Are GO (1966)
 Devil Doll (1964)
 The Hand (1965)
 Mad Monster Party? (1967)

1970s 
 Puppet On A Chain (1971)
 Pinocchio (1972)
 The Year Without a Santa Claus (1974)
 Emmet Otter's Jug-Band Christmas (1977)
 Magic (1978)
 The Muppet Movie (1979)
 Nutcracker Fantasy (1979)

1980s 
 The Empire Strikes Back (1980)
 The Dark Crystal (1982)
 Return of the Jedi (1983)
 Gremlins (1984)
 Follow That Bird (1985)
 Labyrinth (1986)
 Puppet Master Series (1989–1999)

1990s 
 Dolly Dearest (1991)
 Dollman v. Demonic Toys (1993)
 101 Dalmatians (1996)
 Mystery Science Theater 3000: The Movie (1996)
 A Rat's Tale (1997)
 Ragdoll (1999)
 Being John Malkovich (1999)

After 2000s 
 102 Dalmatians (2000)
 Legend of the Sacred Stone (2000)
 Team America: World Police (2004)
 Dead Silence (2007)
 Scooby-Doo! Adventures: The Mystery Map (2014)
 The Happytime Murders (2018)

Descriptions of some classical puppet films 
With the development of technology, stop motion puppetry is discovered in 1900s. Dolly's Toys (1902) is considered as the first puppet film in history. It is made by British film Pioneer Arthur Melbourne-Cooper. It is about a boy's fantasy that all his toys come to life. Arthur Melbourne-Cooper is the creator of the world's first animation films. On the basis of Dolly's Toys, Arthur made another film which is Dreams of Toyland. Two films have similar plots . The story is always around children and their toys.

The Great Gabbo (1929) changes the plot. In this film, a ventriloquist who calls himself the Great Gabbo begins to lose his sense of identity when his only means of expression is through his wooden dummy. As the Great Gabbo begins to rely more and more on his dummy, he begins to go mad. The story is adapted from "Rival Dummy" by Ben Hecht. It brings the puppets to adult's world.

The Czech Year (1947) is directed by Jirí Trnka. Jirí Trnkais an animation director and he used to build an early puppet theatre. The Czech Year is his first feature film. In The Czech Year, It has six stories: "Shrovetide", "Spring", "Legend About St. Prokop", "The Fair", "The Feast" and "Bethlehem". Though the puppet design is simply due to the technology, the story is interesting and is full of life. The director begins to use puppet films to reflect the culture of their countries.

In 1949, Czech director Milos Makovec and Jirí Trnka directed The Emperor's Nightingale. The story is about a Chinese emperor. He prefers the tinkling of a bejewelled mechanical bird to the song of a real nightingale. When the Emperor is near death, a nightingale's song restores his health. In this film, eastern countries' culture is presented through a fairytale. The play shows traditional Chinese lion dance, puppetry, and a pair of tigers and pandas. In the meantime, It has "strong ethical components".

Tiny Hero(1953) is the first Chinese  colour puppet film. It tells the story that brave children fight against a bad wolf and save other animals in the forest. It is produced by Shanghai Film Studio. Since then, China has created over 136 puppet films.

In the same year, US director Charles Walters made his first puppet film Lili. It is a love story in a carnival. LILI is an orphan. A crippled puppeteer Mel Ferrer treats Lili with contempt. However, he loves LILI. He only expresses his love through talking to his puppets. Lili is a sign of the early drama puppet film.

Thunderbirds Are GO (1966) is the start of the Thunderbird series. It is a science fiction story. The background of the film is in mid-2060s. The setting is in a secret base in the Pacific Ocean. Thunderbirds is a top life-saving organisation and the story. Anywhere in the world which has a serious disaster or accident can be immediately rushed to eliminate by Thunderbirds. It is directed by  Gerry Anderson.

Devil Doll (1964) is a British horror puppet film. The main character Vorelli is a ventriloquist and a hypnotist. He owns a magic puppet which can behave like a real man. To get his purpose, he asks the puppet to kill people. A series of mysterious murders begins.The director Lindsay Shonteff is known as making crime thriller films. He puts many thriller elements into the puppet film. It is one of the earliest thriller puppet films.

The Ruka (1965) is also directed by Jirí Trnka. In The Ruka, a huge hand approaches a small happy potter and wants him to sculpt its statue. After the potter refusing his request, he uses different ways to threat him.It is a tragedy in the end. It is the final work of Jirí Trnka and it wins the highest animation award in his country. However, it is too dark and ironic to politics. It almost  banned by the Communist Czechoslovakian government at that time.

Mad Monster Party? (1967) is directed by Jules Bass. It is a fantasy story. Dr Frankenstein is retiring from the monster-making business and prepares an election. In the meantime, he discovers an important secret. The background of the film is Halloween and the film is full of interesting monster elements.Puppet On A Chain (1971) is directed by Geoffrey Reeve. In the film, a U.S agent arrives in Amsterdam to investigate a heroin smuggling ring. The city is out of control and the police is unwilling to deal with it. He has to fight alone with those bad guys. It is an action and thriller puppet film.The Muppet Movie'' (1979) is the first film of the Muppet series. The story starts from Frog Kermit who is approached by a Hollywood agent to audition for the chance of a lifetime. In his way to Hollywood, he meets several strange but interesting friends. They get together and a lot of funny things happens. It is directed by James Frawley. In 2004, Disney company purchased the copyright of Muppet Movie and made a new film which was The Muppet (2011).

Influence 
Though puppetry has a 4000 years history, few people are interested in puppetry nowadays since the story of puppetry is repetitive and the stage setting is too simple compared with modern films. Puppet film innovates in preserving the form of puppetry and combines it with films. Puppet film focuses on the storytelling as the core idea and enriches the character figure. Puppet film creates more fantastic stories and brings people deeper thoughts. Puppet film inherits the culture of puppetry and makes it more suitable for the modern trend.

Many puppet films are animated puppet films. Different from the normal animation, puppet film create a conversation between human and non-human. It produces many fantastic ideas for animation industries.

Furthermore, Puppet film motivates a new element in horror film. From the Puppet Master Series, more and more puppets appear as evil and horrible elements in modern films. Dead Silence is a good example.

See also 
 List of puppet films

References 

 
1970s in film
1980s in film